Bad Neuenahr-Ahrweiler is a spa town in the German Bundesland of Rhineland-Palatinate that serves as the capital of the Ahrweiler district. The A61 motorway connects the town with cities like Cologne and Mainz. Formed by the merging of the towns (now districts) of Bad Neuenahr and Ahrweiler in 1969, Bad Neuenahr-Ahrweiler consists of 11 such districts.

Geography
Bad Neuenahr-Ahrweiler rests in the Ahr valley on the left bank of the Rhine river in the north of Rhineland-Palatinate. Bad Neuenahr-Ahrweiler nestles in the Ahr Hills.

The highest hill in the area is the Häuschen at  metres above sea level. Nearby are the hills of Steckenberg, Neuenahrer, and Talerweiterung. There used to be castles on the last two of these hills.

Neighbouring communities
Bad Neuenahr-Ahrweiler is surrounded by the following villages and towns (clockwise from the north): Grafschaft, Remagen, Sinzig, Königsfeld, Schalkenbach, Heckenbach, Kesseling, Rech and Dernau. The nearest cities are Bonn and Koblenz.

Districts
Bad Neuenahr is divided into Ortsbezirke which consist of one or more districts. The Ortsbezirke be represented by local councils. The largest district, Bad Neuenahr, was originally made up of three communities, which are still seen as districts.

Population statistics as of 31 March 2013 (main and secondary residence):

Climate

History

Antiquity 
Discoveries dating to the Hallstatt period (1000–500 BC) show farming activity by Celts that dwelled in the area. The Gallic Wars (58–50 BC) resulted in the forced relocation of the indigenous Eburones to the Middle Rhine. Several Roman discoveries date from the 1st to 3rd centuries. Most notable is the Villa Rustica of Bad Neuenahr.

Middle Ages
In 893 AD, Ahrweiler was mentioned as Arwilre, Arewilre, Arewilere, and later Areweiller in the Prüm Urbar (register of estates owned by Prüm Abbey). The abbey of Ahrweiler owned a manor with 24 farmsteads; 50 acres of farmland and 76 acres of vineyards. The first mention of a parish church occurred in Neuenahr Castle and surrounding county (Newenare) from 1204 to 1225.
In 1246 was founded one of the oldest German inns Gasthaus Sanct Peter.

Modern Times
During the 2021 European floods much of the town was submerged and many died.

Economy
The German Army's Logistics Centre (main depot) is located in an underground facility.
Bad Neuenahr-Ahrweiler has been home to the traditional mineral water "Heppinger" since 1584.
The "Apollinaris" mineral water company was founded in Bad Neuenahr in 1852.

Transport
The town has five stations on the Ahr Valley Railway and provides hourly connections to Bonn.

Sport
Bad Neuenahr-Ahrweiler is the home of the successful women's football team, SC 07 Bad Neuenahr.

Twin towns – sister cities

Bad Neuenahr-Ahrweiler is twinned with:
 Brasschaat, Belgium

Notable people

Cyrillus Jarre (1878–1952), Franciscan Archbishop in Jinan
Markus Stenz (born 1965), conductor
Björn Glasner (born 1973), cyclist
Jan van Eijden (born 1976), cyclist
Pierre Kaffer (born 1976), racing driver
Bianca Rech (born 1981), footballer
Ricarda Funk (born 1992), canoeist

Associated with the town
Karl Marx (1818–1883), philosopher and economist, stayed in a spa resort in Bad Neuenahr in 1877 
Peter Friedhofen (1819–1860), founder of the Charitable Brethren of Maria Hilf, who practiced his trade first in Ahrweiler
Wolfgang Müller von Königswinter (1816–1873), novelist and poet, died in Bad Neuenahr
Maria Magdalena Merten (1883–1918), nun, member of the Ursulines near Ahrweiler
Ebba Tesdorpf (1851–1920), illustrator and watercolorist, died in Ahrweiler
Paul Metternich (1853–1934), diplomat, died in the district of Heppingen
Max von Schillings (1868–1933), composer and conductor
Christian Hülsmeyer (1891–1957), inventor, physicist and entrepreneur, died in Ahrweiler

References

External links

 

Spa towns in Germany
Populated places in Ahrweiler (district)